The Brogberg is a hill, 567 metres high, in the Palatine Forest in Germany. It is located west of Iggelbach, a village in the municipality of Elmstein. Northeast of the hill rises the Iggelbach stream, a left tributary of the Helmbach. The Brogberg lies entirely within the territory of the municipality of Elmstein.

Maps 
Topographic map, 1:50,000 series, issued by the State Survey Office of Rhineland-Palatinate (Landesvermessungsamt Rheinland-Pfalz), 1993
Brogberg in the landscape information system of the Rhineland-Palatinate Conservation Authority (Naturschutzverwaltung Rheinland-Pfalz)

Mountains and hills of Rhineland-Palatinate
Mountains and hills of the Palatinate Forest
Elmstein